Evelyn Mary Dove (11 January 1902 – 7 March 1987) was a British singer and actress, who early in her career drew comparisons with Josephine Baker. Of Sierra Leone Creole and English parentage, Dove is recognized as a "trailblazing performer": in 1939, she made history as the first black singer to feature on BBC Radio, building a solid reputation not only through her work in Britain but also internationally, travelling to France, Germany, Italy, Austria, the Netherlands, Hungary, the United States, India and Spain. She was featured as a Google Doodle on what would have been her 117th birthday in 2019.

Family background
Evelyn Mary Dove was born at the Lying-in Hospital, Endell Street, London, the daughter of leading Sierra Leonean barrister Francis (Frans) Dove (1869–1949) and his English first wife Augusta, née Winchester, from whom he was later divorced. Evelyn's older brother Frank Dove, who studied law at Oxford University, was called up by the British army in 1915 and fought at the Battle of Cambrai, being awarded the Military Medal.

Early years
Evelyn Dove studied singing, piano, and elocution at the Royal Academy of Music from 1917 until 1919, when she graduated, and on 27 September that year married Milton Alphonso Luke in London. Howard Rye records that she was using the name "Norma Winchester" when she became a member of the Southern Syncopated Orchestra (SSO), a band composed of British West Indian and West African and American musicians who were popularising black music on the UK club scene. On 9 October 1921, eight or nine members of the SSO and around 27 other passengers drowned when the SS Rowan sailing from Glasgow to Dublin collided with another ship and sank. Dove and other SSO survivors such as Cyril Blake took part on 14 October in the "Survivors Sacred Concert".

When in 1925 the all-Black revue Chocolate Kiddies toured Europe from New York, she joined the cast, replacing Lottie Gee, who had to return to the US, and the show toured western Europe for a year, before going to the USSR to play in Leningrad and Moscow, where the audience included Stalin, according to Stephen Bourne, who has researched and written about Dove for the Dictionary of National Biography and elsewhere.

Dove's career burgeoned internationally in the 1920s and '30s. She was performing at London's Mile End Empire in June 1926, then five months later Evelyn Dove and Her Plantation Creoles – "the only singing and dancing act of its kind in Europe" – appeared at Wintergarten in Berlin, and her revue appeared in the Netherlands in February 1927. She was very popular in Italy, where she lived for some years, before in 1932 going to France to replace Josephine Baker starring in a revue at the Casino de Paris. She subsequently went to the US, where in 1936 she was the headline cabaret act at the famous Harlem nightclub Connie's Inn. In New York she was photographed by the celebrated photographer Carl Van Vechten.

Her travels also took her to Bombay, India, where on 7 October 1937 The Evening News of India reviewed her opening-night performance at the Harbour Bar:

1939–49
The decade from 1939 to 1949 marked the height of Dove's career in Britain, when she did much notable radio work broadcasting with the BBC. As Stephen Bourne notes: "Throughout World War II she enjoyed the same appeal as the 'Forces Sweetheart', Vera Lynn. The BBC employed Evelyn all through the war, and she proved to be one of radio’s most popular singers, appearing in a wide range of music and variety programmes."

A memo from producer Eric Fawcett to a colleague on 6 June 1947 states:

She appeared regularly on such popular music and variety radio programmes as Rhapsody in Black, Calling the West Indies, Variety Bandbox, Music For You, Caribbean Carnival, and Mississippi Nights. Particularly successful was the series Serenade in Sepia (1945–47), for which she made more than 50 broadcasts with Trinidadian folk-singer Edric Connor, attracting so many listeners that the BBC decided to make a television version.

In 1947 Dove and Connor – along with other artists including Mable Lee, Cyril Blake and his Calypso Band, Buddy Bradley, Winifred Atwell, and Adelaide Hall – performed in Variety in Sepia, an early example of a UK television special dedicated to Black talent, which was filmed live on 7 October 1947 at the RadiOlympia Theatre, Alexandra Palace, London, and aired on BBC TV.

Later career
Leaving the BBC in 1949, Dove worked in cabaret in India, Paris and Spain. When she returned to Britain at the end of 1950, as Stephen Bourne has written, she struggled to find work, "though she did appear in the cast of London Melody with ice-skater Belita and comedian Norman Wisdom at London's Empress Hall in 1951. Despite her experience and talent, she found herself understudying Muriel Smith in the role of Bloody Mary in the Rodgers and Hammerstein musical South Pacific at Drury Lane." In 1955, her search for work led her to apply for a job as a Post Office telephonist, asking the BBC for a reference. In 1956 the BBC cast her as Eartha Kitt's mother in a television drama called Mrs Patterson, and more television work followed, and then a role on the West End musical stage, as one of the stars of Langston Hughes's Simply Heavenly, directed by Laurence Harvey. Bourne notes that another cast member was Isabelle Lucas, who later recalled:

Evelyn Dove died of pneumonia at Horton Hospital in Epsom, Surrey, aged 85, on 7 March 1987, registered as "Evelyn Dove, otherwise Brantley" (she had married her third husband William Newton Brantley, in 1958, having previously been married to Felix John Basil Inglis Allen in 1941).

Legacy

Dove features on the two-CD compilation Negro Spirituals – The Concert Tradition 1909 – 1948 singing the spiritual "Couldn't Hear Nobody Pray".

On 18 September 1993, Moira Stuart featured Evelyn Dove in Salutations, a BBC Radio 2 series celebrating black British and British-based musical entertainers who came to fame between the 1930s and 1950s.

A biography by Stephen Bourne, entitled Evelyn Dove: Britain's Black Cabaret Queen, was published in October 2016 by Jacaranda Books.

On 11 January 2019, which would have been Dove's 117th birthday, Google celebrated her life in one of their first "doodles" of the year.

Selected filmography
1958: The Green Pastures – Noah's wife
1957: Another Part of the Forest – Coralee
1956: Mrs. Patterson – Anna Hicks
1954: Halcyon Days – Mrs Carter

References

Further reading
 Stephen Bourne, Evelyn Dove: Britain's Black Cabaret Queen, London: Jacaranda Books, 2016,

External links

 "Couldn't Hear Nobody Pray (Negro Spiritual)" by Evelyn Dove, soprano, c. 1926.
 "My Heart Belongs to Daddy, Billy Cotton, 1939".
 "Evelyn Dove (1902–1987)", Devotional by Sonia Boyce, at National Portrait Gallery, London.
 "Evelyn Dove (1902–1987)" at IMDb.
 
 Evelyn Dove at Vintage Black Glamour by Nichelle Gainer.

1902 births
1987 deaths
English people of Sierra Leonean descent
Sierra Leone Creole people
20th-century Black British women singers
British entertainers
Alumni of the Royal Academy of Music
English radio personalities
Singers from London
Black British actresses
British cabaret performers